Godfrey Borman (born 7 May 1939) is a South African former cricketer. He played in seven first-class matches for Eastern Province from 1960/61 to 1963/64.

See also
 List of Eastern Province representative cricketers

References

External links
 

1939 births
Living people
South African cricketers
Eastern Province cricketers
People from Makhanda, Eastern Cape
Cricketers from the Eastern Cape